Phenomenon is the third studio album by English hard rock band UFO, released in May 1974. It was the band's first album to feature lead guitarist Michael Schenker, who replaced Mick Bolton.

Production 
Their third studio album, Phenomenon was UFO's debut with major label Chrysalis Records and their first to be released in the United States. With the arrival of ex-Scorpions lead guitarist Michael Schenker, Phenomenon saw UFO begin to leave their blues-based "space rock" sound behind and transition to a more straightforward hard rock sound.

The album was produced by Leo Lyons, bassist of British rock group Ten Years After. All tracks were recorded at Morgan Studios in London. The original cover design and photos were by Hipgnosis.

Influence 
British heavy metal band Iron Maiden released a cover version of "Doctor Doctor" as the b-side of the "Lord of the Flies" single in 1995. They also included it in their Eddie's Archive boxed set collection of 2002.

Track listing

Personnel

UFO 
 Phil Mogg – vocals
 Andy Parker – drums
 Pete Way – bass
 Michael Schenker – guitar

Additional personnel 
 Bernie Marsden – guitar on tracks 11 and 12

Production 
Leo Lyons – producer
Mike Bobak – engineer
Hipgnosis – cover art

Charts

References

UFO (band) albums
1974 albums
Albums with cover art by Hipgnosis
Albums produced by Leo Lyons
Chrysalis Records albums
Albums recorded at Morgan Sound Studios